The 2008 Penn Quakers football team was an American football team that represented the University of Pennsylvania in the 2008 NCAA Division I FCS football season. It was the 132nd season of play for the Quakers. The team was led by Al Bagnoli, in his 17th season as head coach. The Quakers played their home games at historic Franklin Field on the university campus in Philadelphia. Penn averaged 11,284 fans per game.

Schedule

References

Penn
Penn Quakers football seasons
Penn Quakers football